Benandsebastian is a visual artist duo that was formed in 2006 by Ben Clement (born in 1981 in Oxford, England) and Sebastian de la Cour (born in 1980 in Copenhagen, Denmark). The duo's elaborately crafted sculptural and installation art works have been shown in Europe, in the United States, and in Japan. benandsebastian live and work in Berlin and Copenhagen.

Artistic Practice
benandsebastian's artworks use the language of architecture as a means of addressing the relationship between the psychological spaces of the mind and the physical spaces of the body and its surroundings. The duo's exhibition, Phantom Limbs, which took 'the presence of absence' as its common theme, showed at The Danish Museum of Art & Design in Copenhagen, Denmark from November 2011 until April 2012 and was on display at Trapholt Museum in Kolding, Denmark, until April 2013.

References

External links
 Official website

Danish artist groups and collectives